Typhoon Judy of July 1989 was a strong tropical cyclone that caused extensive damage and loss of life in Japan, South Korea and the eastern Soviet Union. Originating from a monsoon trough on July 21, Judy began as a tropical depression west of the Northern Mariana Islands. Tracking west-northwest, the system gradually intensified into a tropical storm and was given the name Judy on July 23. By this time, the storm had turned due north. Two days later, Judy attained typhoon status as it began a gradual turn to the west-northwest. Striking Kyushu on July 27, interaction with the island's mountainous terrain caused Judy to quickly weaken as it neared South Korea. The weakened storm struck the country west of Pusan the following day before losing its identity near the border with North Korea. The remnants of Judy were last noted over the Sea of Japan.

In Japan, damaging winds from the typhoon left approximately 4 million people without power. Significant flooding in the country resulted in 11 deaths and $28.9 million in damage. In South Korea, heavy rains from the storm exacerbated ongoing floods, leading to at least 20 fatalities. Flooding from the remnants of Judy affected the Soviet Far East, temporarily severing the Trans-Siberian Railway and killing 15 people.

Meteorological history

In mid-July, a monsoon trough located west of the Northern Mariana Islands produced two tropical disturbances. The first of these tracked due west and later became Tropical Storm Irving. The second of these disturbances remained poorly organized and development into a tropical cyclone was expected to be slow. By July 21, an area of low pressure formed within the system and convection associated with it increased. Situated underneath an anticyclone, upper-level outflow also improved. Further aided by a tropical upper tropospheric trough to the northwest, the depression intensified into a tropical storm on July 23 and was assigned the name Judy by the JTWC.

On July 23, a subtropical ridge to the northeast of Judy caused the system to turn northward. This turn was not well anticipated by tropical cyclone forecast models. By July 25, satellite imagery indicated that Judy had intensified into a typhoon.

On July 26, the typhoon turned towards the northwest and weakened somewhat. Late the next day, Judy struck the southern coast of Kyushu before moving over the Korea Strait. Interaction with the mountainous terrain of the island caused the storm to degenerate. Once onshore, rapid weakening took place with Judy being downgraded to a tropical depression within 12 hours. The remnants of Judy were last noted on July 29 over the Sea of Japan.

Impact

On July 26, the Japan Meteorological Agency began warning residents of the typhoon's imminent arrival, stating that Judy would approach western parts of the country in two days. The following day, heavy rain and strong wind warnings were issued for much of Kyushu. Heavy rains from the storm affected much of southern Japan. Significant flooding and landslides from the storm destroyed 25 homes and damaged many more. In Nichinan, Miyazaki, roughly 1,800 people evacuated as a river rose and threatened to flood parts of the city. Train service throughout Kyushu was significantly disrupted, with 110,000 passengers stranded. Damage throughout the island was placed at $3.8 million. Agricultural losses from the storm reached 3.5 billion yen ($25.1 million). In all, Typhoon Judy killed 11 people in Japan, destroyed 76 homes and damaged 10,664 others.

On July 28, typhoon and heavy rain warnings were issued for all of South Korea. Numerous people in low-lying areas were evacuated. Thousands of vessels were also called to port to ride out the storm. Winds up to  battered coastal areas of South Korea, uprooting many trees and leaving thousands without power. In Yeosu, hundreds of windows were blown out by the winds. Heavy rains, amounting to at least  along the Yeongsan River, from the storm exacerbated ongoing floods in the country. In Pusan, 15 people were killed by the storm, 9 by landslides and 6 by structural collapse or flooding. Approximately 2,000 homes were damaged or destroyed in the city. In some areas, flood waters were "knee-deep." Throughout the country, 20 people were confirmed to have been killed by the storm; however, media reports indicated that 24 people perished. According to Korean officials, roughly 47,000 people were left homeless and losses reached 1.2 billion won (US$1.8 million). In the wake of Typhoon Judy, the South Korean Red Cross set up soup kitchens.

The remnants of Judy produced heavy rains in the Soviet Far East in early August, resulting in significant flooding. In Primorsky Krai, at least 15 people were killed by the floods which virtually cut off part of the Trans-Siberian Railway and washed out 267 bridges. A total of 109 settlements were also inundated. Approximately  of land was underwater at the height of the floods. In addition to the loss of human life, 75,000 cattle drowned.

See also

1989 Pacific typhoon season
Typhoon Maemi
Typhoon Rusa

Notes

References

External links
Japan Meteorological Agency
Joint Typhoon Warning Center 

1989 Pacific typhoon season
Typhoons
Typhoons in Japan
Typhoons in South Korea